Marcos Paulo Lima Batista Silva (born on 18 January 2003), known as Marcos Paulo, it is a Brazilian footballer who plays as a left back. He currently plays for Flamengo, on loan from Nova Iguaçu.

Career
Marcos Paulo made his debut on the 26 January 2022, starting for Flamengo in the Campeonato Carioca 2–1 home win against Portuguesa da Ilha.

Career statistics

References

External links

2003 births
Living people
Brazilian footballers
Association football defenders
Campeonato Brasileiro Série A players
CR Flamengo footballers